"Sonny's Blues" is a 1957 short story written by James Baldwin, originally published in Partisan Review. The story contains the recollections of a black algebra teacher in 1950s Harlem as he reacts to his brother Sonny's drug addiction, arrest, and recovery. Baldwin republished the work in the 1965 short story collection Going to Meet the Man.

Plot

"Sonny's Blues" is a story written in the first-person singular narrative style. Much of the story is told through a series of flashbacks as memory and family history are revealed to be central drivers of the trauma and alienation experienced by Sonny and the Narrator.

The story opens with the unnamed narrator reading about a heroin bust resulting in the arrest of a man named Sonny, his brother. The narrator goes about his day as an algebra teacher at a high school in Harlem, but begins to ponder Sonny's fate and worry about the boys in his class. After school, he meets a friend of Sonny, who laments Sonny will struggle with addiction even after his detox and release. 

After the narrator's daughter Grace dies of polio, he finally decides to reach out to Sonny. The narrator remembers leaving for the war, leaving Sonny with his wife Isabel and her parents. Sonny decides to play the piano, and his passion is obsessive. Once Isabel's parents find out that Sonny has not been attending school, he leaves their house, drops out of school, and joins the Navy. 

Sonny returns from the war. Their relationship sours, as the narrator intermittently fights with Sonny.

Back in the present, the narrator reveals that Grace's death has caused him to reflect on his role as an older brother, surmising that his absence impaired Sonny's personal growth. The narrator resolves to reconcile with Sonny. 

While Isabel takes her children to see their grandparents, the narrator contemplates searching Sonny's room. He changes his mind, however, when he sees Sonny in a revival meeting in the street below his apartment, where a woman sings with a tambourine alongside her brother and sister, and enraptures the audience.

Some time later, Sonny invites the narrator to watch him play in Greenwich Village. The narrator begrudgingly agrees to go. Sonny explains his heroin addiction in vague analogies. The woman's performance reminded him of the rush he got using heroin, equating it to a need to feel in control. The narrator asks Sonny if he has to feel like that to play. Sonny answers that some people do. The narrator then asks Sonny if it is worth killing himself just to try to escape suffering. Sonny replies that he will not die faster than anyone else trying not to suffer. Sonny reveals that the reason he wanted to leave Harlem was to escape the drugs. 

The brothers go to the jazz club in Greenwich Village. The narrator realizes how revered Sonny is there as he hears him play. In the beginning, Sonny falters, as he has not played for over a year, but his playing eventually proves to be brilliant and he wins over the narrator and everyone in the club. The narrator sends a cup of Scotch and milk up to the piano for Sonny and the two share a brief moment of bonding. The narrator finally understands it is through music that Sonny is able to turn his suffering into something worthwhile.

But the story ends with an ominous symbol: the Cup of Trembling, which leaves readers suspecting that the brothers will continue to face challenges in spite of this moment of harmony.

Characters
The narrator (Sonny's brother) is the main character; his name is never mentioned in the story. He is a high school algebra teacher and family man. Unlike Sonny who is constantly struggling with his feelings, he chooses to ignore his own pain.
Sonny is the narrator's brother. The reader sees him from his brother's perspective as a quiet, introspective person. Sonny is also described by the narrator as occasionally outgoing and wild, but not crazy. He recovers from a jail term and heroin addiction and becomes a jazz musician.
Sonny's friend used to live near Sonny and the narrator when they were children. Sonny's friend is implied to be a beggar. In the story, he meets the narrator outside the high school to give him the news about Sonny's incarceration. They have a conversation about Sonny as he walks the narrator to his subway stop.
 Isabel is the narrator's wife, Sonny's sister-in-law. She is open and talkative. After Sonny's mother died, Sonny temporarily stayed with Isabel in her parents' house, while his brother was in the Army.
Sonny's mother is the wise, yet sober matriarch of the family. Her death causes the narrator to return from the war.
Sonny's father portrays himself as a tough man. Sonny's mother tells the narrator that Sonny's father often cried due to the death of his brother. Sonny's father himself dies when Sonny is fifteen.
Sonny's uncle is Sonny's father's brother. Sonny's mother tells the narrator the story of how he died in front of Sonny's father by a drunk driver.
Creole is a bass player who leads the band that Sonny plays in at the end of the story. He functions as a kind of father figure for Sonny.

Symbolism and themes
Darkness and light
Music
Ice
Pain, passing it on, and growing from it
Absence

References to other works
 Louis Armstrong and Charlie Parker are mentioned during a conversation between Sonny and his brother.
 In the final scene Creole, the band and Sonny play "Am I Blue?".
 A reference to a passage in the Bible is made at the end of the story, when Baldwin compares the Scotch and milk placed in front of Sonny as the "cup of trembling." This is an allusion to Isaiah 51:17.

Songs referenced
"Lord You Brought Me From a Long Ways Off"
"Mighty Long Way You've Brought Me"
"Some Cold, Rainy Day"
"The Old Ship of Zion"
"If I Could Hear My Mother Pray Again"
"God Be with You Till We Meet Again"
"Am I Blue?"

Historical context
Throughout the short story there are several mentions of the war, although it is not stated which one. Considering the story occurs during the mid-20th century, critics argue it could be either the Korean War or the Second World War.

References

External links
PDF of the short story as included in The Jazz Fiction Anthology
SparkNotes discussion
ENotes discussion
Archive of the 1957 Partisan Review that originally published Sonny's Blues

1957 short stories
Short stories by James Baldwin